Salausa John Ah Ching  is a Samoan politician and former member of the Legislative Assembly of Samoa. He is a member of the Human Rights Protection Party.

Salausa trained as a doctor and worked as an ObGyn at LBJ Tropical Medical Center in American Samoa for 20 years. He moved to Samoa after retiring in 2011. He was first elected to the Legislative Assembly of Samoa in the 2016 Samoan general election and appointed Associate Minister of Health. He lost his seat in the 2021 election. An election petition by him was struck out in June 2021.

Recognition
In 2017 he was awarded the P.S.R.H. President's Medal by the Pacific Society for Reproductive Health.

References

Living people
Members of the Legislative Assembly of Samoa
Samoan physicians
Human Rights Protection Party politicians
Year of birth missing (living people)